Manu Rere is a weekly New Zealand television educational show hosted by Kaa Williams.

References

External links
Manu Rere at Māori Television

Māori Television original programming
2004 New Zealand television series debuts